Pattabiram West railway station is one of the railway station of the Chennai Central–Arakkonam section of the Chennai Suburban Railway Network. The station serves the neighbourhoods of Pattabiram. It has an elevation of 40 m above sea level.

See also

 Chennai Suburban Railway
 Railway stations in Chennai

References

External links
 Pattabiram West railway station at Indiarailinfo.com

Stations of Chennai Suburban Railway
Railway stations in Chennai
Railway stations in Tiruvallur district